Arbaud may refer to:

People with the surname
André-Elzéard d'Arbaud de Jouques (1676-1744), French aristocrat, lawyer and public official.
André-Elzéard d'Arbaud de Jouques II (1737-1793), French aristocrat, lawyer and public official.
Azalaïs d'Arbaud (1834-1917), French author. 
Bache-Elzéar-Alexandre d'Arbaud de Jouques (1720-1793), French aristocrat and public official. 
François d'Arbaud de Porchères (1590-1640), French poet.
Joseph d'Arbaud (1874–1950), French poet.
Joseph Charles André d'Arbaud de Jouques (1769–1849), French aristocrat, military officer and public official.
Lamberto Arbaud, Roman Catholic prelate.
Paul Arbaud (1832-1911), French book collector.

Location
Hôtel d'Arbaud-Jouques, historic building in France.